Besard Šabović (or Besard Ferri; born 5 January 1998) is a Swedish professional footballer who plays for Djurgårdens IF as a centre midfielder. He has represented both Sweden and North Macedonia at youth international level.

Club career

Early career
Šabović started out playing for Brommapojkarna at age five. He took part in the TV4-show called Fotbollsfabriken (The Football Factory), which plotted the best 15-years old players in the Brommapojkarna's academy.

Djurgården
On 18 February 2015, Šabović joined with Djurgården, on a three-year under-21 contract. On 12 January 2016, Šabović was promoted to the first team and signed a four-year contract. On 24 April 2016, he made his debut in a 1–0 away defeat against Malmö after coming on as a substitute at 77th minute in place of Alexander Faltsetas.

Loan to Brommapojkarna 
On 24 March 2017, Šabović returned to Superettan side Brommapojkarna, on a season-long loan. On 1 April 2017, he made his debut in a 0–0 away draw against Dalkurd after coming on as a substitute at 89th minute in place of Markus Gustafsson.

Loan to Dalkurd 
On 29 March 2019, Šabović joined Superettan side Dalkurd, on a season-long loan with the opportunity to playing for Djurgården during the loan spell also. On 7 April 2019, he made his debut in a 0–4 home defeat against the former club Brommapojkarna after being named in the starting line-up. 

On 1 July 2019, Šabović was called up for a game for Djurgården against Kalmar FF, where he was subbed in for the last few minutes.

Khimki
On 22 June 2021, he signed with Russian Premier League club FC Khimki. Šabović left Khimki on 3 June 2022.

Return to Djurgården
On 10 August 2022, Šabović signed a 2.5-year contract with Djurgårdens IF.

International career

North Macedonia

Under-21
On 14 March 2019, Šabović was named as part of the North Macedonia U21 squad for 2019 Antalya Cup. On 22 March 2019, he made his debut with North Macedonia U21 in a match against Ukraine U21 after coming on as a substitute at 62nd minute in place of Jani Atanasov.

Personal life
Šabović was born in Skopje, Macedonia to Montenegrin Albanian father from Plav and Serbian Albanian mother from Medveđa. He is the great-grandson of the member of the Albanian nationalist organization League of Prizren, Jakup Ferri.

Career statistics

Club

Honours
Djurgården
Allsvenskan: 2019

References

External links
  (archive)
  (archive)
 

1998 births
Footballers from Skopje
Albanian footballers from North Macedonia
Macedonian emigrants to Sweden
Swedish people of Macedonian descent
Swedish people of Albanian descent
Swedish people of Serbian descent 
Swedish people of Montenegrin descent
Living people
Swedish footballers
Sweden youth international footballers
Sweden under-21 international footballers
Macedonian footballers
North Macedonia under-21 international footballers
Association football midfielders
Djurgårdens IF Fotboll players
IF Brommapojkarna players
Dalkurd FF players
Mjällby AIF players
Kayserispor footballers
FC Khimki players
Allsvenskan players
Superettan players
Süper Lig players
Russian Premier League players
Swedish expatriate footballers
Expatriate footballers in Turkey
Swedish expatriate sportspeople in Turkey
Expatriate footballers in Russia
Swedish expatriate sportspeople in Russia